Eugène Kabongo Ngoy (born 3 November 1960) is a Congolese former professional footballer who played as a forward for R.F.C. Seraing, RC Paris, Anderlecht, Olympique Lyonnais and Bastia.

References

1960 births
Living people
Footballers from Kinshasa
Democratic Republic of the Congo footballers
Democratic Republic of the Congo expatriate footballers
Democratic Republic of the Congo international footballers
1988 African Cup of Nations players
Association football forwards
Belgian Pro League players
Ligue 1 players
Ligue 2 players
R.F.C. Seraing (1904) players
Racing Club de France Football players
R.S.C. Anderlecht players
Olympique Lyonnais players
SC Bastia players
Democratic Republic of the Congo expatriate sportspeople in Belgium
Democratic Republic of the Congo expatriate sportspeople in France
Expatriate footballers in Belgium
Expatriate footballers in France
Democratic Republic of the Congo football managers
Democratic Republic of the Congo national football team managers
21st-century Democratic Republic of the Congo people